Haskell L. Nichols was a Republican politician who served in both houses of the Michigan Legislature between 1933 and 1966.

A native of Homer, Nichols served in the U.S. Army during World War I. He served as the Jackson County circuit court commissioner before being elected to the Michigan House of Representatives in 1932. He was defeated in his bid for a third term in 1936 by Charles Snow, but won their rematch in 1938. In the interim (1937–38), he chaired the Jackson County Republican Party.

After two more terms in the House, Nichols won election to the Michigan Senate in 1942 where he served 12 terms. He was defeated in the Republican primary in 1966 by his eventual successor James Fleming.

Nichols was a Freemason and a member of numerous civic organizations, including Kiwanis, the Elks, the Shriners, the Jaycees, the Eagles, and the Moose. He died on April 30, 1991, aged 94.

In 1992, the Legislature named a portion of US-127 in Jackson County for Nichols.

References

1896 births
1991 deaths
Republican Party members of the Michigan House of Representatives
Republican Party Michigan state senators
20th-century American politicians
United States Army personnel of World War I